Augustynów may refer to the following places:
Augustynów, Bełchatów County in Łódź Voivodeship (central Poland)
Augustynów, Sieradz County in Łódź Voivodeship (central Poland)
Augustynów, Wieruszów County in Łódź Voivodeship (central Poland)
Augustynów, Koło County in Greater Poland Voivodeship (west-central Poland)
Augustynów, Słupca County in Greater Poland Voivodeship (west-central Poland)